Botataung is a Burmese name that may refer to:

 Botataung Pagoda:  A pagoda in eastern Yangon, Myanmar
 Botataung Pagoda Road:  An avenue in eastern Yangon leading to the Botataung Pagoda.
 Botataung Township:  A township in eastern Yangon
 The Botataung:  Now defunct Burmese language national daily newspaper